The Letov Š-12 was a fighter aircraft built by Letov in the early 1920s.

Design
The Š-12 was a monoplane based on the Letov Š-4. The aircraft remained a prototype only without entering mass production.

Specifications (Š-12)

References

1920s Czechoslovakian fighter aircraft
S-12
Monoplanes
Single-engined tractor aircraft
Aircraft first flown in 1924